The Sangguniang Barangay, also known as the Barangay Council, and formerly as the Rural Council and then the Barrio Council, is the legislative body of a barangay, the lowest form of government in the Philippines. The term is coined from the Tagalog words sanggunian (literally, "advisory") and barangay.

Each council is headed by a barangay captain, and comprises seven members all titled barangay kagawad (barangay councilor), and the chairman of the Sangguniang Kabataan, the barangay's youth council, for a total of eight members. All of these officers are elected at large. As with any other elective local official in the Philippines, a member of the Sangguniang Barangay must be a Filipino citizen and a resident of the barangay that he or she plans to run for at least one year immediately preceding the barangay elections. In addition, the candidate must be able to write in Filipino or other language or dialect in the Philippines. For those who are aspiring to be a barangay captain or a member of the Sangguniang Barangay, they must be at least 18 years old on the day of election while for the candidates for Sanggunian Kabataan, they must be at least 15 years old but not more than 21 years old on the day of the election.

As a collegiate body, a barangay council primarily passes ordinances and resolutions for the effective administration of the barangay. Its powers and functions are defined by the Local Government Code of 1991. As for the other officials, the secretary and the treasurer are appointed by the barangay captain with the concurrence of the Sangguniang Barangay. Their qualifications, powers, and duties are laid down also in the Local Government Code of 1991.

History

During the American Colonial Period, appointed Rural Councils were created, with four councillors assisting the council's Barrio Lieutenant, now known as the Barangay Captain. The body was later renamed Barrio Council. The 1959 Barrio Charter Act, passed after Philippine independence in 1946, changed the council from being appointed to elected.

In 1982, Batas Pambansa (lit. "National Law") Bilang (Number) 222 was passed to provide an act for election of barangay officials, and for other purposes. In this act, barangay officials consist of a Punong Barangay (barangay captain) and six Kagawad (Councilmen) of the Sangguniang Barangay. The Local Government Code of 1991 redefined this and it is prevailing law for the roles and responsibilities of the Sangguniang Barangay.

See also
 League of Barangays of the Philippines
 List of cities and municipalities in the Philippines

References

External links
 Barrio Charter Act on ChanRobles.com

Barangays of the Philippines
Local government in the Philippines
Legislatures of the Philippines
Tagalog words and phrases